This article shows statistics of individual players for the football club F.C. Copenhagen. It also lists all matches that F.C. Copenhagen played in the 2011–12 season.

Players

Squad information
This section show the squad as currently, considering all players who are confirmedly moved in and out (see section Players in / out).

Squad stats

Players in / out

In

Out

Club

Coaching staff

Kit

Other information

Competitions

Overall

Danish Superliga

Classification

Results summary

Results by round

UEFA Champions League

Third qualifying round

Play-off round

Results summary

UEFA Europa League

Group B

Classification

Results by round

Results summary

Matches

Competitive

References

External links
 F.C. Copenhagen official website

2011-12
Danish football clubs 2011–12 season